Robert Jones (1 March 1886 – 20 May 1951) was a Barbadian cricketer. He played in one first-class match for the Barbados cricket team in 1911/12.

See also
 List of Barbadian representative cricketers

References

External links
 

1886 births
1951 deaths
Barbadian cricketers
Barbados cricketers
People from Saint Michael, Barbados